Gerard Crosbie (born 1 October 1984), professionally known as Gerry Cinnamon, is a Scottish singer-songwriter and acoustic guitarist. He sings in his local accent with "brutally honest" lyrics.

Career

Early life and bands
Crosbie was raised in 'The Valley', a residential area of the Castlemilk district of Glasgow. He has stated that as a child he listened to his mother's music cassettes including albums by The Rolling Stones, Simon & Garfunkel and The Beatles. He has also stated that he was a fan of Oasis, as well as The La's. He also has a particular admiration for the work of Bob Dylan.

Having experienced problems in the local area and in school as a young teenager, he spent some time living in London with the father of a friend; finding himself with little to do "apart from watch cricket or play guitar", he became proficient in the instrument (as well as the harmonica). On returning to Scotland he began writing songs, with his growing interest in creating and performing music proving a distraction in his attempts to hold down jobs in various industries over several years.

While performing a solo gig at a college he met aspiring producer Chris Marshall, a neighbour from Castlemilk. They began collaborating on a casual basis with Marshall arranging the songs and Crosbie the lyricist, and eventually formed a lo-fi band, The Cinnamons, along with Lori Duncan, Dave Bass and Gav Hunter; with Gerry as frontman, they released a five-song EP in 2010. Crosbie subsequently adopted the Cinnamon name as a solo performer and his later catalogue contains some compositions from the era, such as "Sometimes".

An Open mic night in a bar on Sauchiehall Street in central Glasgow gave him an opportunity to perform his songs, and the event became increasingly popular.

Rise in popularity and live shows
In 2014, having sold-out gigs at small venues purely through word of mouth and social media, he was invited to write and perform a song at a rally event in George Square ahead of the referendum on Scottish independence. The song, Hope Over Fear, which was released as a single, introduced him to a wider audience – however he has stated that he had no desire to become a figurehead for the Yes campaign.

In summer 2015, Cinnamon supported John Power on tour, released another single, Kampfire Vampire, and performed to a large crowd on the T-Break Stage at T in the Park, fulfilling a long-held ambition to play at the festival.

In July 2016 he again performed at T in the Park, this time at the 'King Tut's Wah Wah Tent' stage as he had hoped to do a year earlier. Despite having one of the traditionally least popular time slots across the weekend (2pm on Friday), his performance was again well-attended. In October he was announced as 'Best Live Act' at the 2016 Scottish Alternative Music Awards.

In November, without being signed to a record label, he headlined a sold-out show at Glasgow's O2 ABC Glasgow, the promotion of which had consisted of a single message on his Facebook profile; he later admitted he was so disorganised that he had not even prepared a set list for the performance. In December, he supported Ocean Colour Scene in their show at the SSE Hydro.

2017: Debut album
In July 2017, Cinnamon appeared on the King Tut's stage at the TRNSMT festival (a non-camping replacement for T in the Park) on Glasgow Green, again playing to a sizeable and enthusiastic crowd. In September, he released his first album Erratic Cinematic, funded via the PledgeMusic platform and produced by Chris Marshall, which quickly rose to the number 1 spot in the UK iTunes chart for singer-songwriters (briefly outselling the likes of Ed Sheeran), and 6th overall.

On the back of the album release, he announced a show at the Barrowland Ballroom to take place in December, with all tickets sold within hours of being released, followed a few days later by a second date which sold out even more swiftly. This achievement – a first for an unsigned artist – later earned him a place in the 'Barrowland Hall of Fame' alongside the likes of Glasgow son Frankie Miller, Noel Gallagher, David Bowie and Ocean Colour Scene.

In October he was presented with a 'Great Scot Award' for entertainment, following previous winners of the category such as Paolo Nutini and Kevin Bridges. In December it was confirmed he would be returning to TRNSMT in 2018, this time on the main stage.

A few days before playing his Barrowland gigs, Cinnamon spoke out against operators of ticket scalping websites, after discovering they had purchased gig tickets at face value and then offered them for sale on their sites to desperate fans at hugely inflated prices.

Following his main stage performance at TRNSMT 2018, his debut album entered the Scottish Albums Chart, peaking at no. 7 in July 2018.

2018: Touring
The early months of 2018 were dominated by a sold-out Scottish tour, followed by several dates across the rest of Britain and Ireland, with the vast majority of the tickets once more sold out well in advance and some gigs moved to higher capacity venues due to the demand. During one performance in Inverness, he briefly stopped playing to confront a member of the audience who had thrown a drink onto the stage.

On 28 June 2018, two days before the event, the organisers of TRNSMT announced that Cinnamon's performance at the festival had been moved to a later, higher profile time slot (benefitting from J Hus's cancellation). He was also booked to play at the RiZE Festival (the replacement of the long-running V Festival) and the Tartan Heart Festival (Belladrum) during August 2018.

A further four gigs were announced for the coming December in Glasgow, including on Christmas Eve; those also sold out almost instantly, leaving unlucky fans frustrated. Some complained to Cinnamon via social media about the prices of tickets available on resale sites, leading him to respond publicly "If you think I want some corporate goon reselling my ticks for 10x the asking price you've lost it. If you think I'm somehow involved or can stop it when the biggest bands in the world can't do anything about it then you're misinformed at best". Further December 2018 shows in Dundee, Aberdeen and Kilmarnock were later announced which again sold out in seconds.

Following a run of arena shows supporting The Courteeners, Gerry announced his own England and Ireland tour. Tickets for the tour again sold out within seconds leading to the addition of extra dates and upgraded venues.

2019
Cinnamon headlined a stage at Edinburgh's Hogmanay 2018/19 street party. In January 2019 he played two gigs in Amsterdam. In February, he was announced as one of the Friday main stage performers at the forthcoming TRNSMT event in July, and was also added to the bill for several other festivals in the summer season including Benicàssim, Isle of Wight, Kendal Calling, Y Not and Glastonbury Festival.

On 7 May 2019, it was announced that Cinnamon would support Liam Gallagher at his gig at Irish Independent Park in Cork on 23 June 2019.

On 12 July, it was announced that he would be performing at the new P&J Live venue in Aberdeen on Saturday 23 November, which subsequently broke the record for highest attendance at a Scottish indoor event at 15,000 attendees, and two shows at the SSE Hydro in his hometown of Glasgow on Friday 20 December. The arena tour was further extended throughout venues in England and Ireland with all 125,000 tickets selling out in advance.

In December, Cinnamon supported Liam Gallagher during his Australian tour.

2020
In November 2019 Cinnamon announced via a Twitter post that his second album named The Bonny would be released on 17 April 2020 on his own label Little Runaway. Alongside the album announcement, Cinnamon revealed that he will play the biggest show of his career at the 50,000+ capacity Hampden Park, becoming the first Scottish act to headline the national stadium. Tickets went on sale on 15 November 2019 and were sold out within hours.

On 11 February 2020, it was announced that Gerry Cinnamon would perform the penultimate slot at Reading and Leeds festival in August 2020; the festivals were later cancelled due to the COVID-19 pandemic.

Gerry Cinnamon's second studio album, The Bonny, released on 17 April 2020 debuted at number one on the UK and Irish Albums Charts. The album was also the fastest-selling vinyl of the year and the third biggest-selling UK album released in 2020.

Cinnamon was scheduled to tour the United States for the first time as special guest of the Dropkick Murphys and Rancid in May 2020, pending the status of the COVID-19 outbreak there.

On 21 May 2020, Cinnamon announced that due to the coronavirus pandemic, he had moved the dates for his UK and Ireland tour to May and June 2021.

Views on the music industry
He has encouraged aspiring artists to believe in themselves despite a lack of expensive backing, and expressed a scathing distaste for the nature of music industry marketing and excessive hyping of inferior quality artists, stating in 2016:

Discography

Studio albums

Singles

Other certified songs

References

External links
Biography and discography at AllMusic

1985 births
Living people
People educated at Kings Park Secondary School
21st-century Scottish male singers
Scottish rock guitarists
Scottish rock singers
Scottish singer-songwriters
Musicians from Glasgow
21st-century British guitarists
Indie folk musicians
British male singer-songwriters